Messenger is the English surname of the following people: 

Charles A. Messenger (1855–?), British-Australian rower
Chas Messenger (Charles William Messenger, 1914–2008), British cyclist
Gordon Messenger (1962), retired senior Royal Marines officer who served as Vice-Chief of the Defence Staff
Herbert "Dally" Messenger, Australia rugby footballer
James Messenger, English World Champion Sculler
Lillian Rozell Messenger (1843-1921; pen name, "Zena Clifton"), American poet
Melinda Messenger, British TV personality and model
Rob Messenger, Australian Politician
Ruth Messenger (1884 –  1964), American historian
Wally Messenger, Australians rugby league footballer
 

Occupational surnames
English-language occupational surnames